Lakeview may refer to:

Australia
Lakeview, South Australia
Lakeview Homestead Complex, a homestead located in the Eurobodalla Shire

Canada

Lakeview, Alberta
Lakeview, Calgary, Alberta

Lakeview Heights, British Columbia
Lakeview, Manitoba, see Icelandic Canadians

Lakeview, New Brunswick
Lakeview, Halifax, Nova Scotia

Lakeview, Newfoundland and Labrador
Lakeview, Elgin County, Ontario
Lakeview, Mississauga in Peel Region, Ontario
Lakeview, Simcoe County, Ontario
Lakeview Beach, Ontario
Lakeview Heights, Ontario
Lakeview Park (Nepean), Nepean, Ontario
Lakeview, Harrington, Quebec
Lakeview-Terrasse, Quebec, Deschênes District, Gatineau, Quebec
Rural Municipality of Lakeview No. 337, Saskatchewan
Lakeview, Regina, Saskatchewan, a residential neighbourhood
Lakeview, Saskatoon, Saskatchewan, a residential neighbourhood
Lakeview Beach, Saskatchewan, Rural Municipality of North Qu'Appelle No. 187

United Kingdom
Lakeview Estate, Bethnal Green, London
 Lakeview, an area of the Wixams new town development in Bedfordshire

United States
Lakeview, Alabama
Lakeview, Arkansas
Lakeview, California, in Riverside County
Lakeview, Georgia
Lakeview, Illinois
Lakeview, Chicago, Illinois
Lakeview, Kentucky, since annexed by Fort Wright
Lakeview, Louisiana, a suburb of Shreveport
Lakeview, New Orleans, Louisiana, a neighborhood of New Orleans
Lakeview, Michigan
Lakeview, Missouri
Lakeview, Paterson, New Jersey
Lakeview, New York
Lakeview, Ohio
Lakeview, Oregon
Lakeview, South Dakota
Lakeview, Texas
Lakeview, Washington
Lacy Lakeview, Texas
Lakeview Mountain, a subfeature of Diamond Peak, Oregon

Schools
École Lakeview School, Saskatoon, Saskatchewan
Lakeview High School (disambiguation)
Lakeview Jr. High School, Downers Grove, Illinois
Lakeview Middle School (disambiguation), multiple schools

See also
Lake View (disambiguation)